Willem Wium Basson  (23 October 1975 – 21 April 2001) was a South African rugby union player.

Playing career
Basson matriculated at Paarl Boys' High School and in 1993 represented the  Schools team at the annual Craven Week tournament. Basson made his senior provincial debut for the Blue Bulls in 1997 and from 1998 also played for the Northern Bulls in the Super Rugby competition.

Basson toured with the Springboks to Europe in 1997. He did not play in any test matches for the Springboks but played in two tour matches.

Basson died on 21 April 2001, approximately a month after he was diagnosed with cancer.

See also
List of South Africa national rugby union players – Springbok no. 661

References

1975 births
2001 deaths
South African rugby union players
South Africa international rugby union players
Blue Bulls players
Bulls (rugby union) players
Alumni of Paarl Boys' High School
Deaths from cancer in South Africa
Rugby union players from the Western Cape
Rugby union locks